Edwin Koech (born 23 July 1961) is a Kenyan middle-distance runner. He competed in the men's 800 metres at the 1984 Summer Olympics.

References

1961 births
Living people
Athletes (track and field) at the 1984 Summer Olympics
Kenyan male middle-distance runners
Olympic athletes of Kenya
Place of birth missing (living people)